Camille Bordage (March 23, 1905 – July 12, 1997) was a Canadian politician. He served in the Legislative Assembly of New Brunswick from 1964 to 1967 as member of the Liberal party.

References

1905 births
1997 deaths
New Brunswick Liberal Association MLAs